Beschorneria yuccoides is a species of succulent plant belonging to the family Asparagaceae, subfamily Agavoideae.

Etymology
The epithet yuccoides is a compound of the botanical name of the genus Yucca and the Greek suffix -ό-εἶδος (o-eidos)  oides meaning "likeness".

Subspecies
 Beschorneria yuccoides subsp. yuccoides
 Beschorneria yuccoides subsp. dekosteriana (K.Koch) Govaerts

Description

Beschorneria yuccoides is a stemless plant with 20 to 35 linear, lanceolate, leathery leaves that are widened at their base. The leaf margins are finely denticulate. The stem and the bract are red. The flowers are 40 to 50 mm long.

Distribution

Cultivation
This plant is not tolerant of severe freezes, and is best suited to warm, sheltered south- or west-facing places in full sun, where temperatures do not fall below . Alternatively, it can be grown under glass.

It grows outdoors at Earlscliffe, Howth, Co. Dublin, Ireland, at a latitude of 53.3º N, where it benefits from the unusually favourable microclimate.

In cultivation in the UK it has gained the Royal Horticultural Society’s Award of Garden Merit.

References

 Biolib
 Urs Eggli  The International Plant Names Index

External links
 
 San Marcos Growers
 Cool Tropical Plants

Agavoideae
Flora of Mexico
Garden plants